Big Lake is a city in Sherburne County, Minnesota, United States. The population was 11,686 at the 2020 census.

Facts
In 2019 it was named the safest city to live in, and the second safest city in 2021 with the lowest property crime rate in the state.

It houses the tallest structure in Minnesota, the KPXM-TV Tower.

U.S. Highway 10 and Minnesota State Highway 25 are two of the main routes in Big Lake.

Big Lake is located 41 miles northwest of Minneapolis; and 27 miles southeast of St. Cloud.

It was originally called Humboldt until 1867.

The average median household income is $87,129

Has a population of 11,226, with 49.5% male and 50.5% female.

Geography
A portion of the city lies along the Elk River.

Located about forty-one miles northwest of the Twin Cities, Big Lake was once a popular location for escapes from the city, its lakes dotted with summer cabins.  Now it is considered an exurb of the metro area, with a significant portion of residents commuting into the Cities daily. 

The lake for which the town is named was once an important part of the Twin Cities economy, as in the days before modern refrigerators, much of the ice for metropolitan iceboxes was harvested from Big Lake.

There is a connection to Mitchell Lake by a small channel on the north side of Big Lake.

Big Lake station is currently the northernmost terminus of the Northstar Commuter Rail line connecting the northwest suburbs and downtown Minneapolis; the line will be extended to St. Cloud at some point in the future.

Currently, commuters can use the Northstar Link Commuter Bus to reach St. Cloud, MN.

Demographics

The median house/condo value in 2005 was estimated to be $207,400 (67% increase from 2000).

2020 census
As of the census of 2020 there were 11,686 people, and 3,846 households. The racial makeup of the city was 89.0% White, 3.3% African American, 0.3% Native American, 0.2% Asian, and 3.3% from two or more races. Hispanic or Latinos of any race made up 5.6% of the population.

2010 census
As of the census of 2010, there were 10,060 people, 3,377 households, and 2,500 families living in the city. The racial makeup of the city was 92.4% White, 1.7% African American, 0.4% Native American, 1.2% Asian, 1.6% from other races, and 2.6% from two or more races. Hispanic or Latino of any race were 3.7% of the population.

There were 3,377 households, of which 50.1% had children under the age of 18 living with them, 56.4% were married couples living together, 10.3% had a female householder with no husband present, 7.3% had a male householder with no wife present, and 26.0% were non-families. 18.6% of all households were made up of individuals, and 4.6% had someone living alone who was 65 years of age or older. The average household size was 2.97 and the average family size was 3.38.

The median age in the city was 29.5 years. 34.3% of residents were under the age of 18; 7.6% were between the ages of 18 and 24; 35.7% were from 25 to 44; 17.1% were from 45 to 64; and 5.3% were 65 years of age or older. The gender makeup of the city was 50.4% male and 49.6% female.

2013 Estimated Population is 10,298

2000 census
As of the census of 2000, there were 6,063 people, 2,117 households, and 1,570 families living in the city. The racial makeup of the city was 96.70% White, 0.13% African American, 0.49% Native American, 0.43% Asian, 0.02% Pacific Islander, 0.89% from other races, and 1.34% from two or more races. Hispanic or Latino of any race were 1.80% of the population. 38.6% were of German, 15.2% Norwegian, 7.5% Irish, 7.5% Swedish and 5.9% Polish ancestry.

There were 2,117 households, out of which 44.6% had children under the age of 18 living with them, 58.1% were married couples living together, 9.9% had a female householder with no husband present, and 25.8% were non-families. 17.4% of all households were made up of individuals, and 4.5% had someone living alone who was 65 years of age or older.  The average household size was 2.86 and the average family size was 3.23.

In the city, the population was spread out, with 32.5% under the age of 18, 9.8% from 18 to 24, 37.3% from 25 to 44, 14.8% from 45 to 64, and 5.6% who were 65 years of age or older.  The median age was 29 years. For every 100 females, there were 101.4 males.  For every 100 females age 18 and over, there were 101.2 males.

The median income for a household in the city was $50,658, and the median income for a family was $54,038. Males had a median income of $35,279 versus $26,601 for females. The per capita income for the city was $18,931.  About 3.5% of families and 4.7% of the population were below the poverty line, including 5.2% of those under age 18 and 8.1% of those age 65 or over.

History
Big Lake was originally called Humboldt until 1867.

Big Lake was originally established to harvest ice in both of its towns' lakes (Big and Mitchell Lakes).  Due to the rich amount of ice Big Lake provided, it needed to be transported quickly, enabling Big Lake to be suitable for a railway station which was built in 1871. Big Lake was served by both the Great Northern Railway and Northern Pacific Railroad, later Burlington Northern Railroad, now BNSF Railway.

The city was host to a station of both GN and NP railways until the NP station burned in 1918, in later years both railroads shared a depot. The depot no longer stands.

Culture
Big Lake is known locally for its annual summer festival "Spud Fest," which celebrates all things potato-related. The festival is also known for its large softball tournament, attracting teams from all over the state. 

Big Lake is also home to the area famous ice auger company, Strike Master.

The local newspaper is the Patriot Newspaper 
 
The local youth baseball league is the Big Lake Baseball Association.

Big Lake is also host to the largest youth football tournament in the Upper Midwest.

Education
The city hosts ISD #727, which includes Big Lake High School.

References

External links
 City of Big Lake, MN – Official Website
 Big Lake Public Schools website

Cities in Minnesota
Cities in Sherburne County, Minnesota